Ignite is the fourth full-length album by the industrial rock band Econoline Crush. It was recorded from July 24, 2007 to October 12, 2007, and released on the independent label FNN on January 15, 2008.  The album was distributed by Universal Music Group. The band re-enlisted producer Sylvia Massy for this album.  Massy had previously produced the band's 1998 album The Devil You Know. Ignite is the first album with the band membership of Kai Markus on guitar, Scott Whalen on bass, Brent Fitz on drums and Trevor Hurst on vocals.  The album was recorded at RadioStar Studios, owned by Massy, and located in the town of Weed, California.

The track "Get Out of the Way" was the goal song of the NHL's Edmonton Oilers during the 2009-2010 season.

Track listing
 "Could Have Been" - 2:41
 "Dirty" - 3:08
 "Psychotic" - 3:47
 "Get Out of the Way" - 3:42
 "Hole in My Heart" - 4:24
 "Unbelievable" - 4:00
 "The Love You Feel" - 4:05
 "Heaven's Falling" - 3:31
 "Burn It Down" - 2:50
 "Bleed Through" - 3:35

Tracks 11 through 22 of the album are silent.

23. "You Don't Know What It's Like 2007" (hidden track) - 4:00

Credits
 Sylvia Massy - executive producer, engineer, mixing
 Maor Appelbaum - mix assistant engineer, additional musician
 Joe Johnston - producer, engineer
 Matthew J. Doughty - producer, engineer, additional musician / FX
 Dave Watt - additional musician
 Tom Baker - mastering

Personnel
 Trevor Hurst - vocals
 Kai Markus - guitar
 Scott Whalen - bass
 Brent Fitz - drums

References

2008 albums
Econoline Crush albums
Albums produced by Sylvia Massy